Kunhegyes is a town in northeast Jász-Nagykun-Szolnok, which is situated in Hungary.

Twin towns – sister cities

Kunhegyes is twinned with:
 Baia Sprie, Romania (2006)
 Feketić (Mali Iđoš), Serbia (1993)
 Szerzyny, Poland (2006)

References

External links

  in Hungarian

Populated places in Jász-Nagykun-Szolnok County